The highest-selling albums and EPs in the United States are ranked in the Billboard 200, which is published by Billboard magazine. The data are compiled by Nielsen Soundscan based on each album's weekly physical and digital sales. In 2012, a total of 32 albums claimed the top position of the chart. One of which, Canadian singer Michael Bublé's album Christmas started its peak in late 2011.

Adele's album 21 was the longest-running number-one album of the year for the second time, staying atop the chart for eleven non-consecutive weeks. Red by Taylor Swift had the second-most weeks at number one with five. Other albums with extended chart runs include Babel by Mumford & Sons, Tuskegee by Lionel Richie, Blown Away by Carrie Underwood, Born and Raised by John Mayer and Uncaged by Zac Brown Band; each spent two weeks on the top position. Throughout 2012, only one act achieved multiple number-one albums on the chart: One Direction with Up All Night and Take Me Home. Swift's album Red sold 1.21 million copies in its first week, making it the album with the highest weekly sales in 2012. 21 was the biggest-selling album of 2012, with 4,410,000 copies sold.

Chart history

See also
2012 in music
List of Hot 100 number-one singles of 2012 (U.S.)

References 

2012
United States Albums